Phi-Dan was an American subsidiary record label of Phil Spector Productions formed in 1965 by producer Phil Spector.

History 
By 1965, Phil Spector had achieved great success with his label Philles. He produced chart topping singles such as "He's A Rebel" and "You've Lost That Lovin' Feelin." Phi-Dan was partly created to keep promoter Danny Davis occupied. "He wanted to give me a piece of the action because I didn't have a piece of the Philles action," Davis said. The label name is a hybrid of Spector and Davis' first names. Spector also wanted to capitalize on Davis winning the industry's Promotional Man of the Year award in '64 and '65.

Releases 
A handful of singles were released on Phi-Dan by artist including Betty Willis, the Lovelites, and the Ikettes. According to Davis, the records on Phi-Dan consisted of "permutations of the various backing groups he was using in Hollywood." Unlike Philles recordings, none of the releases on Phi-Dan were produced by Spector himself.

The single "Home Of The Brave" by Bonnie & The Treasures peaked at #77 on the Billboard Hot 100 in 1965.

Discography

References 

American record labels
Record labels established in 1965
Record labels disestablished in 1966
Pop record labels
Vanity record labels
Phil Spector